Predaia is a comune in the northern Italian province of Trento of the Trentino Alto Adige region. It was created on 1 January 2015 after the merger of the communes of Coredo, Smarano, Taio, Tres and Vervò.

Notable people
 Eusebio Kino, Jesuit missionary in North America, born in the village of Segno (formerly part of Taio)

Twin towns
 Heroldsberg, Germany, since 1996
 Magdalena de Kino, Mexico

References

External links
Official website

Cities and towns in Trentino-Alto Adige/Südtirol